Milenko Zablaćanski,, (Bogatić, Serbia,  — Belgrade, Serbia), was a Serbian actor, director, and screenwriter.

Career

Zablaćanski graduated from the Faculty of Dramatic Arts (FDU) in Belgrade, studying under Ognjenka Milićević. He began his career in the Boško Buha Theatre and in 1985 he moved to the Terazije Theatre, where he played the lead role in many productions.

Filmography

Death
On 5 January 2008, Zablaćanski's vehicle was in a head-on collision. Zablaćanski received massive head injuries and was carried away unconscious to the Užice hospital. When his condition did not improve and he did not wake from a coma, he was transferred to the Military Medical Academy in Belgrade where he died on 22 January. He was buried on 25 January 2008 in the Alley of Distinguished Citizens in the New Cemetery, Belgrade.

References

External links

1955 births
2008 deaths
Serbian male stage actors
Serbian film directors
Serbian screenwriters
University of Arts in Belgrade alumni
Burials at Belgrade New Cemetery
People from Bogatić
Male screenwriters
Serbian male film actors
20th-century Serbian male actors
21st-century Serbian male actors
Road incident deaths in Serbia
20th-century screenwriters